J. Scott Smart (born John Kenley Tener Smart, November 27, 1902 – January 15, 1960) was an American radio, film and stage actor during the 1930s, 1940s and early 1950s.

Early years
Smart was born in Philadelphia, Pennsylvania. His family later moved to Buffalo, where he was a 1922 graduate of Lafayette High School. He also attended Miami Military Institute.

Smart told a reporter that, before entering show business, he held 30 jobs in three years. Those jobs included selling shoe polish, heaving coal on a boat, being fire chief in a factory, drawing cartoons for a newspaper and designing ads for an advertising agency.

Career
When he was 21, Smart began acting in stock theater in Buffalo, New York. He acted there for five years. After that, a friend set up an audition for a program on NBC. The result was Smart's first role on radio, that of a singing waiter on Whispering Tables. His Broadway credits include A Bell for Adano (1944) and Separate Rooms (1939).

Smart is best known for his lead as Brad Runyon in the detective show The Fat Man, which aired on ABC Radio from 1946 to 1951. (See Laughlin 1994, Dunning 1976, Buxton and Owen 1996.) Jack was a regular on The March of Time and The Fred Allen Show. In fact, he played so many character roles during the early days of radio drama that he became known as the "Lon Chaney of Radio". Jack was also an accomplished stage actor and played roles in major productions of A Bell For Adano and Waiting for Godot. He appeared in many movies, including Kiss of Death and the movie version of The Fat Man. A running gag in the film was Smart getting in and out of the car he rented - a tiny MG! The film was an early major role for Rock Hudson. He vied with noted other rotund actor Bud Stevens for roles requiring fat fellows. In his later life, Smart's roles in radio programs included those shown in the table below.

He was also a member of the casts of The Family Hour and The Teen-Timers Club and was heard frequently on Grand Central Station and Inner Sanctum Mystery.

Personal life
Smart married Alice Coy Wright on July 23, 1931. He was married to Mary-Leigh Smart from 1951 until his death in 1960. They had no children. Jack, together with Mary-Leigh, were an established part of the local arts community in Ogunquit, Maine. Late in life his widow, Mary-Leigh Smart bequeathed a 41-acre oceanfront estate as the Surf Point Artist Colony.

Later years 
Smart lived in Ogunquit, Maine, and indulged his lifelong passion for art in becoming a painter and sculptor. He also had a summer theater in Ogunquit.

Death
Smart died of pancreatic cancer in Springfield, Illinois.

Filmography

References

Buxton, Frank and Bill Owen (1996) The Big Broadcast: 1920-1950 (second edition), New York: Scarecrow Press.
Dallman, V.Y. (1960) Obituary in the Illinois State Register, January 15, 1960.
Dunning, John (1976) Tune In Yesterday: The Ultimate Encyclopedia of Old-Time Radio, 1925–1976, Englewood Cliffs: Prentice-Hall.
Laughlin, Charles D. (1994) J. Scott Smart, a.k.a. The Fat Man. York, Maine: Three Faces East Press.
MacDonald, J. Fred (1979) Don't Touch That Dial: Radio Programming in American Life, 1920–1960. Chicago: Nelson-Hall, p. 173.
Plante, William C. (1960) "J. Scott Smart". The Players Bulletin, spring issue.
Taylor, Robert (1989) Fred Allen: His Life and Wit. Boston: Little, Brown and Company.

Listen to
Internet Archive: The Fat Man (29 episodes)  Note: Only the last six episodes in this archive are from the original American J. Scott Smart series; the rest are from the Australian series.

External links
 
 J. Scott Smart official website
 
 

1902 births
1960 deaths
American male radio actors
American male film actors
American male stage actors
Male actors from Philadelphia
People from Ogunquit, Maine
20th-century American male actors
Lafayette High School (Buffalo, New York) alumni